Vice Admiral George Darby (c.1720 – 1790) was a Royal Navy officer. He commanded HMS Norwich at the capture of Martinique in 1762 during the Seven Years' War. He went on to command the Channel Fleet during the American Revolutionary War and later in that war served as First Naval Lord when he commanded the force that relieved Gibraltar from its siege by the Spanish in April 1781.

Naval career

Early career

Darby was the second son of Jonathan Darby (III) (d.1742/3) and Anna Marie Frend both of Leap Castle, in King's County, Ireland. He joined the Royal Navy as a volunteer in September 1742. Promoted to post-captain on 12 September 1747, he received his first command, the sixth-rate HMS Aldborough. He went on to become commanding officer of the sixth-rate HMS Seahorse in 1756 and of the fourth-rate HMS Norwich in 1757 in which he served under Admiral Rodney at the capture of Martinique in 1762 during the Seven Years' War. After that he became commanding officer of the third-rate HMS Devonshire in 1760.

American War of Independence
In the American Revolutionary War of 1775 to 1783, Admiral Keppel's resignation during the crisis following the Battle of Ushant in 1778 left a vacancy for command of the Channel Fleet. On 23 January 1778 Darby became a rear-admiral and on 19 March 1779 he was promoted to vice-admiral, thanks to his association with Lord Sandwich, First Lord of the Admiralty, during the court martial of Admiral Palliser. Thus he unexpectedly came to command the Channel Fleet in 1780 at a time of grave danger for the kingdom.

Darby was appointed to the Board of Admiralty as First Naval Lord in the North ministry in September 1780. In April 1781 he relieved Gibraltar from its siege by the Spanish, for the second time during that war. This event is recorded in a full-length portrait by George Romney, painted 1783–6, which hangs in the National Maritime Museum. On the change of ministry in April 1782 he resigned his command and did not again serve at sea; he also resigned his seat on the Admiralty Board. He was Member of Parliament for Plymouth, from 1780 to 1784. He lived at Newtown House at Newtown in Hampshire and died in 1790.

Personal life
When in England he lived at Newtown House, Newtown, Hampshire and had five children. Darby was married to Mary, daughter of Sir William St Quintin, 4th Baronet and then to Ann Bridges, a widow whose brother was colonial agent and MP, Richard Jackson.
Darby's male issue achieved high military rank and held significant wealth:
William Thomas St Quentin (1769-1805) lived at Darby House, Sunbury on Thames and later at Scampston Hall, Malton, Yorkshire
Colonel Matthew Chitty Downes St. Quintin (his son)
Major-General Matthew Chitty Darby-Griffith (1772–1823) lived at Padworth House, Berkshire

References

Sources

External links 
 History of Parliament: George Darby 

|-

Royal Navy vice admirals
1720 births
1790 deaths
Royal Navy personnel of the American Revolutionary War
Royal Navy personnel of the Seven Years' War
Members of the Parliament of Great Britain for Plymouth
British MPs 1780–1784
People from Newtown, Hampshire
People associated with Sandleford, Berkshire
People from County Offaly
Lords of the Admiralty